Gallagh Man is the name given to a preserved Iron Age bog body found in County Galway, Ireland, in 1821. The presence of a withy hoop – rope made from twisted willow twigs – found wrapped around his throat indicates that he was strangled during a ritual killing or executed as a criminal. 

His teeth and hair were almost fully preserved, and even though the body is severely dehydrated and thus shriveled, it has suffered from little shrinkage and it is described overall as exceptionally well-preserved. The body was bought by the Royal Irish Academy in 1829 and is now possessed by the archaeology department of the National Museum of Ireland, Dublin, where it is one of four such bodies in their collection.

Discovery
Gallagh Man was discovered in 1821 by labourers working for the O'Kelly family while digging peat from a bog in Gallagh, a townland outside Castleblakeney, County Galway. The O'Kellys were a well-known and powerful family in the region, whose ancestors had built a castle at Gallagh during the medieval period. The body became a local curiosity which the O'Kelly family occasionally dug up to show to paying visitors before burying it again. The corpse remained in situ until excavated fully and bought by the Royal Irish Academy in 1829, and later transferred to the National Museum of Ireland. 

However, as the O'Kelly family had dug and reburied the remains a number of times, parts of the find, especially the clothing became damaged. In addition, its exact find location was not recorded, but the likely area is adjacent to a contemporary townland, parish, and barony boundary, which was the medieval boundary of the Uí Maine kingdom ruled by the O'Kelly (Ó Ceallaigh) family.

Cause of death

The withy hoop found around his neck may originally have been the part of a spancel used for restraining animals. It was probably used as a garrotte to strangle him, probably during a ritual involving human sacrifice, given that most of such bodies from this period are young males aged 25 to 40 years old, and like many of these victims, his hair had been closely cropped. 

It is also possible that he was murdered without any ritual context, or was a criminal who was executed. However, the willow rope strongly suggests ritual sacrifice; they often appear for this purpose in early Irish mythological stories such as that of the Táin Bó Cúailnge.

Condition

Osteological analysis suggests the man was in his early 20s when he died. His teeth, long dark-reddish hair and beard were well preserved. Unlike many bodies of this time, it does not appear to have shrunk in size, and retains most of its original proportion. Elements of his burial indicate he did not die from natural causes. The body was pinned down by stakes, and a withy hoop was found wrapped around his throat. He was buried naked except for a long deerskin mantle or cape, which reached to his knees, while a long stick was placed in the grave alongside him.

The leather mantle was badly damaged during disinterment, but surviving fragments are displayed at the National Museum. It was sewn together with three knotted gut threads. A 19th-century study states that the "regularity and closeness of the stitches are most remarkable, as shown by the accompanying cut [of a proportion of one of the joinings... see image to right]... this closure was effected by... a looped stitch similar to that used in working a button-hole, so that by having each stitch knotted the chances of ripping was lessened."

See also
List of bog bodies

References

Notes

Sources

 Bentley, Diana. "The Dark Secrets of the Bog Bodies: Interview with Eamonn P. (Ned) Kelly". The International Review of Ancient Art & Archaeology, March/April 2015
 Giles, Melaine. "Iron Age bog bodies of north-western Europe. Representing the dead". Archaeological Dialogues, volume 16, Issue 1, June 2009
 Grant, C.C. (Col). "Irish Celts and their Relics". Hamilton, Ont: Journal and proceedings of the Hamilton Association for the Cultivation of Literature, Science and Art, Part 7, 1891
 Haglund, William; Sorg, Marcella. "Advances in Forensic Taphonomy: Method, Theory, and Archaeological Perspectives". CRC Press, 2001. ASIN: B01G50QMXM
 Haughton, Brian. Hidden History: Lost Civilizations, Secret Knowledge, and Ancient Mysteries. Franklin Lakes, NJ: New Page Books, 2019. 
 Kelly, Eamonn. "An Archaeological Interpretation of Irish Iron Age Bog Bodies". In: "The Archaeology of Violence: Interdisciplinary approaches". The Institute for European and Mediterranean Archaeology Distinguished Monograph, Series 2. State University of New York Press, 2012
 Kelly, Eamonn. "Irish Iron Age Bog Bodies" (lecture). Society of Antiquaries of Scotland, 9 January 2012
 Kelly, Eamonn. "Bodies from the Bog: New Insights into Life and Death in Pagan Celtic Ireland." In: Fagan, Brian (ed), Discovery! Unearthing the Bodies from the Bog: New Insights into Life and Death in Pagan Celtic Ireland’. London: Thames and Hudson, 2007. 
 Kelly, Eamonn. "Secrets of the bog bodies: the enigma of the Iron Age explained". Archaeology Ireland, volume 20, no. 1, issue 75, Spring 2006
 Kelly, Eamonn. "Bog Bodies – Kingship and Sacrifice". Scéal na Móna, volume 13, no. 60, December 2006
 Kelly, Eamonn. "Kingship and Sacrifice: Iron Age Bog Bodies and Boundaries". Archaeology Ireland, Heritage Guide, No. 35, 2006
 Ogilvie, Ticca. "Conserving Bog Bodies: The Key Questions". Journal of Wetland Archaeology, 2020. DOI: 10.1080/14732971.2020.1826196
 Recht, Laerke. Human Sacrifice: Archaeological Perspectives from around the World. Cambridge: Cambridge University Press, 2018. 
 Schuster, John. Haunting museums. NY: Tor, 2013. 
 Tarr, Clayton Carlyle. "Absolute Heathenism: Bog Bodies and the Archaeology of Nineteenth-Century Literature". Nineteenth Century Studies, volume 27, 2013
 Williams, Howard. Archaeologies of Remembrance: Death and Memory in Past Societies. NY: Springer, 2003. 
Wood-Martin, William Gregory. The lake dwellings of Ireland: or ancient lacustrine habitations of Erin, commonly called crannogs. 	Dublin Hodges, Figgis & Co., 1886

1821 archaeological discoveries
Collection of the National Museum of Ireland
Bog bodies
Bogs of Ireland
Celtic archaeological sites
Forensic palynology
Prehistoric Ireland
Pre-Roman Iron Age
Deaths by strangulation